Alexander Metz (born 19 March 1987) is a German international rugby union player, playing for the RG Heidelberg in the Rugby-Bundesliga and the German national rugby union team.

He plays rugby since 1991.

He made his debut for Germany against Romania on 13 February 2010.

Metz was part of a group of German players who were sent to South Africa in 2009 to improve their rugby skills at the  Academy as part of the Wild Rugby Academy program. He was also the captain of the German under-21 team. At the end of the 2010–11 season he left Germany again to study in Durban, South Africa.

Honours

Club
 German rugby union cup
 Winners: 2008
 Runners up: 2009

Stats
Alexander Metz's personal statistics in club and international rugby:

Club

 As of 25 August 2011

National team

 As of 21 December 2010

References

External links
 Alexander Metz at scrum.com
   Alexander Metz at totalrugby.de

1987 births
Living people
German rugby union players
Germany international rugby union players
TSV Handschuhsheim players
RG Heidelberg players
Rugby union flankers